Sweets Corners, Ontario may refer to:

 Sweets Corners, Haldimand County, Ontario
 Sweets Corners, Leeds and Grenville United Counties, Ontario